Dennis Bright (born in Freetown, Sierra Leone) is a former Sierra Leonean cabinet minister. He served as Sierra Leone's Minister of Youth and Sports from 2002 to 2007. Dennis Bright taught French at university and was director of the Franco-Sierra Leonean Pedagogical Centre in Freetown. He is a member of the Creole ethnic group. He was member of the Sierra Leone People's Party (SLPP) before resigning in 2017.

References

External links
http://standardtimespress.net/cgi-bin/artman/publish/article_1676.shtml

Living people
Government ministers of Sierra Leone
Sierra Leone Creole people
People from Freetown
Year of birth missing (living people)
Sierra Leonean academics
Sierra Leonean educators